Asher Hill (born March 19, 1991) is a Canadian retired ice dancer. With previous partner Kharis Ralph, he is the 2008 Canadian national junior champion and 2011 Nebelhorn Trophy bronze medalist. He teamed up with Nicole Orford in 2015.

He has since also collaborated with Dylan Moscovitch, in the program That Figure Skating Show, interviewing figure skaters and commenting on seasonal competitions.

Personal life 
Hill attended Ryerson University (now Toronto Metropolitan University), studying occupational health and safety. He has a twin sister, Acacia. Residing in Pickering, he has worked as a coach and choreographer.

Career 

Asher Hill began skating at age four and took up ice dancing at ten. He skated as a solo dancer before finding a partner. He also competed as a single skater at the national level until 2009.

Partnership with Kharis Ralph
Hill teamed up with Kharis Ralph in 2002. The two won the Canadian pre-novice title in 2006 and the Canadian novice title in 2007. In 2007–08, they debuted on the ISU Junior Grand Prix series and became the 2008 Canadian junior champions.

Ralph/Hill were 8th at the 2008 World Junior Championships. The following season, they won two silver medals on the 2008–2009 ISU Junior Grand Prix circuit and rose to 5th at the World Junior Championships.

Ralph/Hill took another pair of silver medals on the 2009–10 ISU Junior Grand Prix series and placed 4th on the senior level at the 2010 Canadian Championships. They were assigned to their first senior ISU Championships, the 2010 Four Continents, where they placed 6th.

In 2011–12, Ralph/Hill won the bronze medal at the 2011 Nebelhorn Trophy. They were fourth at the 2012 Canadian Championships and were assigned to the 2012 World Championships. Ralph/Hill finished 13th at Worlds. Their partnership ended when Ralph retired from competition at the end of the 2013–14 season.

Partnership with Nicole Orford
Hill teamed up with Nicole Orford following a tryout held in April 2015. At the end of the 2015-2016 season, they announced their retirement on Hill's Instagram page.

Programs

With Nicole Orford

With Kharis Ralph

Competitive highlights 
GP: Grand Prix; JGP: Junior Grand Prix

With Orford

With Ralph

Single skating

References

External links 

 
 

1991 births
Canadian male ice dancers
Living people
People from Pickering, Ontario
Sportspeople from Scarborough, Toronto
21st-century Canadian people